Vilcha railway station (previously Oleksiivka), is a station in Vilcha, Kyiv Oblast, not too far from Pripyat. It is part of the Chernihiv–Ovruch railway, and is included in the transport sector state-owned enterprise Chernobylservis. As of 2022, it is officially active, but there is no passenger service.

History
The station was commissioned in 1928 as part of the Chernihiv-Ovruch railway, with the name Oleksiivka.

In 2017, the Ukrainian government decided to extend the Vilcha-Semykhody section of the Chernihiv-Ovruch railway from the previously dismantled Semykhody railway station to Vilcha for easier access to the Chornobyl New Safe Confinement of the Chornobyl Nuclear Power Plant. The job was given to Energoatom. One of the rail tracks passing through Yaniv was reconstructed, and construction began with two teams beginning at Vilcha and Yaniv station. On July 9, 2021, the two teams met and placed the "golden spike".

Structure
There is one platform in the middle of the station and two tracks. The station building is currently inactive but still exists.

References

External links

Railway stations opened in 1928
Chernobyl Exclusion Zone
1928 establishments in Ukraine
Railway stations in Kyiv Oblast